Charles Meyrick Pritchard (30 September 1882 – 14 August 1916) was a Welsh international rugby union player. He was a member of the winning Welsh team who beat the 1905 touring All Blacks. He played club rugby for Newport RFC and county rugby for Monmouthshire. Pritchard was one of 13 Wales international players to be killed serving in the First World War.

Charles Meyrick Pritchard is not related to Clifford Charles Pritchard

Rugby career
Pritchard joined Newport in 1901, and on 25 January played his first senior game, facing Swansea. He spent his entire rugby career with Newport and during the 1905/06 season was made vice-captain; but after the captain Wyatt Gould was unable to fulfil his duties, Pritchard acted as stand-in captain. The next season, he was given the captaincy, a role he held for three consecutive seasons.

International career
Pritchard made his debut for Wales against Ireland in 1904, while playing club rugby for Newport. Pritchard would play in a further 13 internationals including the famous Match of the Century victory against the 1905 All Black touring team. Although all the Welsh players on the day played their part in the victory over the New Zealanders, Pritchard was commended for his all out defensive play and continual heavy tackling against the All Blacks. He was seen as the star of the Welsh pack and was 'always in the thick of the fight'; fellow Welsh international George Travers would sum up Pritchard's aggressive play against the All Blacks as 'He knocked 'em down like nine pins.'

Pritchard would score his only international try in a 16–3 win against England in a home nations match on 13 January 1906. After a serious injury in 1908 he returned to the Welsh side in the 1909/10 season and played his final game against England in 1910.

International games played
Wales
  1905, 1906, 1907, 1908, 1910
  1910
  1904, 1906, 1907
  1905
  1905, 1906, 1907
  1906

Military service and death
In May 1915 Pritchard was commissioned second lieutenant to the 12th Battalion South Wales Borderers. In November 1915 he was promoted to captain, and in June 1916 he went out to the Western Front with his battalion. On the night of 12 August 1916 he led a trench raid near Loos to capture a German prisoner. Although the raid was successful in its objective, Pritchard was seriously wounded and was carried to No. 1 Casualty Clearing Station a few miles behind the front at Chocques. His last reported words were to ask if they had got the "Hun", and when told they had, he replied 'Well, I have done my bit.' Pritchard died of his wounds at the clearing station on 14 August 1916 and is buried in Chocques Military Cemetery.

Bibliography
 
 
 
 Prescott, Gwyn (2014). Call Them to Remembrance: The Welsh Rugby Internationals who died in the Great War. St. David's Press. .

References

1882 births
1916 deaths
British military personnel killed in the Battle of the Somme
Rugby union players from Newport, Wales
Rugby union flankers
South Wales Borderers soldiers
Welsh rugby union players
Wales international rugby union players
Newport RFC players
Monmouthshire County RFC players
British Army personnel of World War I
Military personnel from Monmouthshire